WAYZ is a country music formatted broadcast radio station licensed to Hagerstown, Maryland, serving the Four-State Area. In Pennsylvania, WAYZ can be heard clearly in parts of southwestern York county, and in all of Adams, Franklin, and Fulton Counties.  WAYZ can be heard as far east as western Baltimore, and as far south as NW suburbs of Washington, DC. WAYZ is owned and operated by VerStandig Broadcasting.

FM 104.7 came on the air in 1946 as WJEJ-FM (sister to WJEJ 1240). Until 2000 the station was known as easy listening/beautiful music formatted WWMD under Hagerstown Broadcasting; it was then traded to Verstandig for 101.5 FM and $2.5 million.

References

External links
 104.7 WAYZ Online
 

AYZ
Radio stations established in 1946
1946 establishments in Maryland